Lueders is a city in Jones and Shackelford counties in the U.S. state of Texas. The population was 346 at the 2010 census. The portion of Lueders located in Jones County is part of the Abilene, Texas metropolitan area.

Geography

Lueders is located in eastern Jones County. The city limits extend east to include  with zero population in Shackelford County.

Texas State Highway 6 passes through the city on Main Street, leading northwest  to Stamford and southeast  to Albany. The Clear Fork of the Brazos River passes just south of the city limits.

Demographics

2020 census

As of the 2020 United States census, there were 258 people, 118 households, and 60 families residing in the city.

2000 census
As of the census of 2000, 125 households, and 75 families residing in the city. The population density was 485.4 people per square mile (186.8/km). There were 168 housing units at an average density of 271.8 per square mile (104.6/km). The racial makeup of the city was 95.67% White, 0.67% African American, 1.33% Native American, 2.00% from other races, and 0.33% from two or more races. Hispanic or Latino of any race were 3.67% of the population.

There were 125 households, out of which 30.4% had children under the age of 18 living with them, 46.4% were married couples living together, 8.8% had a female householder with no husband present, and 40.0% were non-families. 36.8% of all households were made up of individuals, and 20.0% had someone living alone who was 65 years of age or older. The average household size was 2.40 and the average family size was 3.25.

In the city, the population was spread out, with 29.7% under the age of 18, 6.3% from 18 to 24, 20.7% from 25 to 44, 26.3% from 45 to 64, and 17.0% who were 65 years of age or older. The median age was 39 years. For every 100 females, there were 92.3 males. For every 100 females age 18 and over, there were 78.8 males.

The median income for a household in the city was $26,058, and the median income for a family was $29,318. Males had a median income of $25,341 versus $15,000 for females. The per capita income for the city was $13,877. About 11.0% of families and 15.6% of the population were below the poverty line, including 7.2% of those under the age of eighteen and 22.9% of those 65 or over.

Education
Lueders had its own schools until 1967 when they merged with those in Avoca to form the Lueders-Avoca Independent School District.

References

Further reading
 
 

1940 establishments in Texas
Cities in Jones County, Texas
Cities in Shackelford County, Texas
Cities in Texas
Cities in the Abilene metropolitan area